Alonzo Al Johnson (born April 4, 1963) is an American former college and professional football player who was a linebacker in the National Football League (NFL) for two seasons during the 1980s.  Johnson played college football for the University of Florida, and was recognized as an All-American.  He was a second-round pick in the 1986 NFL Draft, and played professionally for the Philadelphia Eagles of the NFL.

Early years 

Johnson was born in Panama City, Florida.  He attended Rutherford High School in Panama City, where he was a standout high school football player for the Rutherford Rams.

College career 

Johnson accepted an athletic scholarship to attend the University of Florida in Gainesville, Florida, where he played for coach Charley Pell and coach Galen Hall's Florida Gators football teams from 1982 to 1985.  Johnson was a key member of the Gators' defense in 1984 and 1985 when the Gators posted identical 9–1–1 overall win–loss records and led the Southeastern Conference (SEC) with best-in-the-conference records of 5–0–1 and 5–1, respectively.  He was a first-team All-SEC selection and a first-team All-American in 1984 and 1985, and also a team captain both years.  He finished his four-year college career with 335 tackles, fifty-five tackles for a loss and twenty-seven quarterback sacks.

Johnson was later voted to the Florida Gators' All-Century Team and All-Time Team, and inducted into the University of Florida Athletic Hall of Fame as a "Gator Great."  In 2006, he was ranked as No. 35 among the top 100 Gators of the first century of Florida football by the sportswriters of The Gainesville Sun.

Professional career 

As a rookie, he played in fifteen games and started nine of them at rightside linebacker, with three interceptions. He left the Eagles before the beginning of the 1987 season in order to enter a drug rehabilitation program, and subsequently only played in three games for the Eagles in 1987. He was placed on the non-football injury list in December 1987, and did not play again.

See also 

 1984 College Football All-America Team
 1985 College Football All-America Team
 Florida Gators football, 1980–89
 List of Florida Gators football All-Americans
 University of Florida Athletic Hall of Fame
 List of Florida Gators in the NFL Draft
 List of Philadelphia Eagles players

References

Bibliography 

 Carlson, Norm, University of Florida Football Vault: The History of the Florida Gators, Whitman Publishing, LLC, Atlanta, Georgia (2007).  .
 Golenbock, Peter, Go Gators!  An Oral History of Florida's Pursuit of Gridiron Glory, Legends Publishing, LLC, St. Petersburg, Florida (2002).  .
 Hairston, Jack, Tales from the Gator Swamp: A Collection of the Greatest Gator Stories Ever Told, Sports Publishing, LLC, Champaign, Illinois (2002).  .
 McCarthy, Kevin M.,  Fightin' Gators: A History of University of Florida Football, Arcadia Publishing, Mount Pleasant, South Carolina (2000).  .
 Nash, Noel, ed., The Gainesville Sun Presents The Greatest Moments in Florida Gators Football, Sports Publishing, Inc., Champaign, Illinois (1998).  .

1963 births
Living people
People from Panama City, Florida
Players of American football from Florida
American football linebackers
Florida Gators football players
All-American college football players
Philadelphia Eagles players